Carmen Ruiz Hernández (born 28 July 1974) is a Spanish actress primarily known for her television work although she has also done theatre and film. She earned early visibility in her career for her performances in Mujeres and Yo soy Bea. She has since featured in series such as Con el culo al aire, Gym Tony, Matadero, Madres. Amor y vida or Deudas.

Biography 
Carmen Ruiz Hernández was born on 28 July 1974 in Madrid, daughter to a hairdresser and a painter. After working for seven years for Telefónica, she left the job and completed her training as an actress. Some of her early film work include a small performance in the 2004 film Crimen Ferpecto and the role of Toribia in Mortadelo and Filemon. Mission: Save the Planet (2008). She earned visibility for her performances in the television series Mujeres and Yo soy Bea, both premiered in 2006.

Filmography 

Television

Film

Accolades

References

Bibliography
 

1974 births
21st-century Spanish actresses
Actresses from Madrid
Spanish television actresses
Spanish film actresses
Spanish stage actresses
Living people